Jeffrey Ulmer (born April 27, 1977) is a Canadian former professional ice hockey right winger. He is currently an assistant coach for the Abbotsford Canucks in the American Hockey League. He played 21 games in the National Hockey League for the New York Rangers during the 2000–01 season and scored three goals. His brother Jason also played professionally for 16 seasons.

Playing career
A product of the University of North Dakota, Ulmer turned pro in 1999, joining the Houston Aeros of the IHL. During the 2000–01 NHL season, he played 21 games for the New York Rangers, scoring three goals. Ulmer moved to Europe in 2003, splitting the 2003–04 campaign between the Cardiff Devils of the Elite Ice Hockey League in the United Kingdom and Lukko of the SM-liiga in Finland. He returned to North America in 2004, spending the season with the Hershey Bears of the American Hockey League before returning to Europe, moving to Germany's Deutsche Eishockey Liga (DEL) with the Hamburg Freezers.

After one season with Hamburg, he moved to fell DEL side Frankfurt Lions for a two-year spell. In 2008, he signed with HC Dinamo Minsk of the new Kontinental Hockey League and was later on 14 October 2008 loaned out for two months to Swiss HC Fribourg-Gottéron. On November 24, 2008, he signed with Modo Hockey of the Swedish Elitserien. On May 11, 2009, Ulmer rejoined the Frankfurt Lions. At the end of the 2009–10 season however, the Lions ceased operations due to increased financial difficulties. Ulmer signed with Metallurg Novokuznetsk in the KHL.

On December 6, Ulmer signed on with Linköpings HC of the Swedish Elitserien. On July 26, 2011, Ulmer announced he had returned to the German DEL with the DEG Metro Stars on a one-year contract. In 2012-13, he played in Finland (Tappara) and Switzerland (Lausanne HC).

Midway into the 2013–14 season, he transferred from HDD Olimpija Ljubljana to establish himself at fellow EBEL club, Innsbruck. Ulmer agreed to a one-year extension on January 23, 2014 and then in March 2015, he had his contract renewed for the 2015-16 season.

As a free agent the following year, Ulmer left the EBEL and signed a contract with Scottish club, Braehead Clan who play in the EIHL for the forthcoming 2016–17 season on July 19, 2016. Ulmer parted company with Braehead in October 2016 by mutual consent and joined the Frederikshavn White Hawks of Metal Ligaen in Denmark for a try-out a couple of days later. He inked a deal with the Frederikshavn outfit for the remainder of the 2016-17 season in early November. On March 3, 2017, in his first playoff game in 4 years, Ulmer made an assist and was Player of the Game in the White Hawks' 4-1 win over the Herning Blue Fox.

Career statistics

Regular season and playoffs

References

External links

1977 births
Living people
Binghamton Senators players
Braehead Clan players
Canadian expatriate ice hockey players in Austria
Canadian expatriate ice hockey players in Belarus
Canadian expatriate ice hockey players in the United States
Canadian expatriate ice hockey players in Finland
Canadian expatriate ice hockey players in Germany
Canadian expatriate ice hockey players in Scotland
Canadian expatriate ice hockey players in Slovenia
Canadian expatriate ice hockey players in Sweden
Canadian expatriate ice hockey players in Switzerland
Canadian expatriate ice hockey players in Wales
Canadian ice hockey right wingers
Cardiff Devils players
EHC Lustenau players
DEG Metro Stars players
Frankfurt Lions players
Frederikshavn White Hawks players
Grand Rapids Griffins players
Hamburg Freezers players
Hartford Wolf Pack players
HC Dinamo Minsk players
HC Fribourg-Gottéron players
HC TWK Innsbruck players
HDD Olimpija Ljubljana players
Hershey Bears players
Houston Aeros (1994–2013) players
Ice hockey people from Saskatchewan
Lausanne HC players
Linköping HC players
Lukko players
Metallurg Novokuznetsk players
Modo Hockey players
NCAA men's ice hockey national champions
New York Rangers players
North Dakota Fighting Hawks men's ice hockey players
Notre Dame Hounds players
Sportspeople from Regina, Saskatchewan
Tappara players
Undrafted National Hockey League players
Canadian expatriate ice hockey players in Denmark
Canadian expatriate ice hockey players in Russia